Michael Lawrence Needham (born April 4, 1970) is a Canadian former professional ice hockey player. He played 86 games in the National Hockey League with the Pittsburgh Penguins and Dallas Stars between 1992 and 1994. Needham was born in Calgary, Alberta, but grew up in Fort Saskatchewan, Alberta.

Playing career
He played in parts of two NHL seasons with the Pittsburgh Penguins and Dallas Stars from 1992 to 1994. He also appeared in five games during the 1992 Stanley Cup Playoffs, for which he earned a Stanley Cup ring as a member of the Penguins.

Coaching career
In 2014, Needham was named the new assistant coach of the Kamloops Blazers in the WHL. He stayed with the organization until 2018, when the Blazers chose not to renew his contract.

Career statistics

Regular season and playoffs

International

Awards and achievements
1990 - WHL West First All-Star Team 
1990 – Played in Memorial Cup (Kamloops)
1990 World Junior Ice Hockey Championships gold medal (Canada)
1992 Stanley Cup Championship  (Pittsburgh)

Transactions
March 21, 1994 – Traded to the Dallas Stars by Pittsburgh for Jim McKenzie.

References

External links
 

1970 births
Living people
Adirondack Red Wings players
Canadian ice hockey right wingers
Cleveland Lumberjacks players
Dallas Stars players
Fort Saskatchewan Traders players
Kalamazoo Wings (1974–2000) players
Kamloops Blazers players
Muskegon Lumberjacks players
Pittsburgh Penguins draft picks
Pittsburgh Penguins players
Ice hockey people from Calgary
People from Fort Saskatchewan
Stanley Cup champions